Henderson Fire Station and Municipal Building is a historic fire station and city hall located at Henderson, Vance County, North Carolina.  The fire station was built in 1908, and is a two-story, red brick eclectic building with a seven-flight stair clock tower.  The city hall section was added in 1928, and is a one-story, "L"-shaped brick structure.

It was listed on the National Register of Historic Places in 1978.  It is located in the Henderson Central Business Historic District.

References

Fire stations on the National Register of Historic Places in North Carolina
Clock towers in North Carolina
Government buildings on the National Register of Historic Places in North Carolina
Government buildings completed in 1908
Buildings and structures in Vance County, North Carolina
National Register of Historic Places in Vance County, North Carolina
1908 establishments in North Carolina
Individually listed contributing properties to historic districts on the National Register in North Carolina
City and town halls on the National Register of Historic Places in North Carolina